Greg Rusedski was the defending champion, but did not participate.

Mark Philippoussis defeated Justin Gimelstob in the final 6–3, 7–5.

Seeds

Draw

Finals

Top half

Bottom half

References
Main Draw
Qualifying Draw

Campbell's Hall of Fame Tennis Championships - Singles